Jesse Arnaud Cook is a Canadian guitarist. He is a Juno Award winner, Acoustic Guitar Player's Choice Award silver winner in the Flamenco Category, and a three-time winner of the Canadian Smooth Jazz award for Guitarist of the Year. He has recorded on the EMI, E1 Music and Narada labels and has sold over 1.5 million records worldwide.

Life and career
Cook was born November 28, 1964 in Paris, France to Canadian photographer and filmmaker John Cook and Canadian television director and producer Heather Cook.

Cook studied in classical and jazz guitar at Canada's Royal Conservatory of Music, York University, and Berklee College of Music in the United States. He has often quipped that he later attempted to unlearn it all while immersing himself in the oral traditions of gypsy music.

After the independent 1995 release in Canada of his debut album, Tempest, he played at the 1995 Catalina Jazz Festival; shortly afterwards, Tempest entered the American Billboard charts at No. 14.

Cook has recorded ten studio albums, five live DVDs and has traveled the world exploring musical traditions that he has blended into his style of rumba flamenca.

In 1998, Cook was nominated for a Juno Award as Instrumental Artist of the Year. In 2001, he received a Juno Nomination for Best Male Artist. In 2001, Cook won a Juno Award in the Best Instrumental Album category for Free Fall. In 2009, he was Acoustic Guitar's Player's Choice Award silver winner in the Flamenco category (gold went to Paco de Lucia). He is a three-time winner of the Canadian Smooth Jazz award for Guitarist of the Year and numerous other awards.

In 2011, Cook began filming, directing, and editing his own music videos with the release of Virtue. He has since directed, filmed, and edited eight music videos, 16 episodes of Friday Night Music, and produced, edited, and mixed the PBS Concert Special Jesse Cook, Beyond Borders.

Cook has said of his music: "If you go to Spain and you play [my] music, they’ll say, what is this? They don’t recognize it as Flamenco because it’s not, it’s a hybrid. I love Flamenco, but I also love world music, jazz, pop, Brazilian Samba, and Persian music."

Discography

Studio albums
Tempest (1995)
Gravity (1996)
Vertigo (1998)
Free Fall (2000)
Nomad (2003)
Frontiers (2007)
The Rumba Foundation (2009)
The Blue Guitar Sessions (2012)
One World (2015)
Beyond Borders (2017)
Libre (2021)

Live albums
Montréal (2004)

Compilation album
The Ultimate Jesse Cook (2005)
Greatest Hits (2010)

Video albums

Other appearances
 Enchantment (2001) Charlotte Church
 Camino Latino (2002) Liona Boyd
 Seed (2003) Afro Celt Sound System

Other compilation appearances
 Guitar Music For Small Rooms (1997) (WEA)
 Gypsy Passion: New Flamenco (1997) (Narada)
 Narada Smooth Jazz (1997) (Narada)
 The Next Generation: Explore Our World (1997) (Narada)
 Narada Film and Television Music Sampler (1998) (Narada)
 Narada Guitar: 15 Years of Collected Works (1998) (Narada)
 Gypsy Soul: New Flamenco (1998) (Narada)
 Obsession: New Flamenco Romance (1999) (Narada)
 Gypsy Fire (2000) (Narada)
 Guitar Greats: The Best of New Flamenco – Volume I (2000) (Baja/TSR Records)
 Narada Guitar 2: The Best of Two Decades (2000) (Narada)
 Buddha Bar III (2001)
 Tabu: Mondo Flamenco (2001) (Narada)
 Camino Latino / Latin Journey – Liona Maria Boyd (2002) (Moston)
 Guitar Greats: The Best of New Flamenco – Volume II (2002) (Baja/TSR Records)
 Best of Narada New Flamenco Guitar (2003) (Narada)
 Guitar Music For Small Rooms 3 (2004) (WEA)
 Gypsy Spice: Best of New Flamenco (2009) (Baja/TSR Records)
 The World of the Spanish Guitar Vol. 1 (2011) (Higher Octave Music)
 Guitar Greats: The Best of New Flamenco – Volume III (2013) (Baja/TSR Records)

See also
 New Flamenco
 Flamenco rumba

References

External links

 Jesse Cook | Official Website
 

Flamenco guitarists
Juno Award for Instrumental Album of the Year winners
Berklee College of Music alumni
Canadian jazz guitarists
Canadian male guitarists
Living people
Narada Productions artists
Waldorf school alumni
Musicians from Toronto
Canadian world music musicians
Canadian male jazz musicians
1964 births